Balcomba is a rural locality split between the Central Highlands Region and the Aboriginal Shire of Woorabinda, Queensland, Australia.

Geography 
Local government boundaries splits Balcomba into three parts:

 the larger northern part in Central Highlands Region
 the smaller middle part in the Aboriginal Shire of Woorabinda
 smaller southern part in Central Highlands Region

References 

Central Highlands Region
Aboriginal Shire of Woorabinda
Localities in Queensland